Henry Wood Elliott (November 13, 1846 – May 25, 1930) was an American watercolor painter, author, and environmentalist whose work primarily focused on Alaskan subjects. He was the author of the 1911 Hay-Elliott Fur Seal Treaty, the first international treaty on wildlife conservation.

A number of his works have an ethnographic bent, displaying aboriginal Alaskans engaging in traditional practices; some of these works are stored in the National Anthropological Archives at the Smithsonian.  Elliott also focused on the Alaskan landscape and wildlife.

In 1886, Elliott published a book entitled Our Arctic Province: Alaska and the Seal Islands, which contains an in-depth exploration of Alaska's history, geography, people, and wildlife.

He became involved in early conservation efforts of the fur seal, in 1905 co-authoring a document with United States Secretary of State John Hay that would eventually become the North Pacific Fur Seal Convention of 1911, the first international treaty dedicated to the conservation of wildlife.

Gallery

References

1846 births
1930 deaths
19th-century American painters
American male painters
20th-century American painters
American naturalists
People of pre-statehood Alaska
19th-century American male artists
20th-century American male artists